Dugan of the Badlands is a 1931 American Western film written and directed by Robert North Bradbury. The film stars Bill Cody and Andy Shuford. It was released on June 24, 1931, by Monogram Pictures.

Plot
Bill Dugan takes charge of a boy after his father (who was Dugan's friend) dies. They become involved with solving the murder of a sheriff, eventually revealing his deputy as the murderer.

Cast          
Bill Cody as Bill Dugan
Andy Shuford as Andy
Blanche Mehaffey as June Manning
Ethan Laidlaw as Dan Kirk
Julian Rivero as Pedro
Earl Dwire as Lang
John Elliott as Sheriff Manning

References

External links
 

1931 films
1930s English-language films
American Western (genre) films
1931 Western (genre) films
Monogram Pictures films
Films directed by Robert N. Bradbury
American black-and-white films
1930s American films